The 2024 United States Senate election in Nevada will be held on November 5, 2024, to elect a member of the United States Senate to represent the state of Nevada. Incumbent first-term Democratic Senator Jacky Rosen was elected with 50.4% of the vote in 2018.

Background
A typical swing state, Nevada is considered to be a purple state at the federal level, especially since in the 2020 presidential election, Joe Biden carried Nevada by about 2 percentage points. Both parties have seen success in the state in recent years. Democrats control both U.S. Senate seats and all but one U.S. Representative in its congressional delegation, while Republicans won the governorship in 2022.

Rosen was first elected in 2018, defeating then-incumbent senator Dean Heller.

This race is considered to be competitive given the state's nearly even partisan lean, however, most analysts consider Rosen to be a slight favorite to win reelection.

Democratic primary

Candidates

Declared
Jacky Rosen, incumbent U.S. Senator

Republican primary

Candidates

Publicly expressed interest
Sam Brown, businessman, Purple Heart recipient, and candidate for U.S. Senate in 2022
Rick Harrison, businessman and reality television personality
Joey Gilbert, attorney, former professional boxer, and candidate for Governor of Nevada in 2022

Potential
Heidi Gansert, Minority Leader of the Nevada Senate
Dean Heller, former U.S. Senator (2011–2019) and candidate for Governor of Nevada in 2022
Brian Krolicki, former Lieutenant Governor of Nevada (2007–2015)
Guy Nohra, venture capitalist
Danny Tarkanian, Douglas County commissioner and perennial candidate

Declined
Adam Laxalt, former Nevada Attorney General (2015–2019), nominee for U.S. Senate in 2022, and nominee for Governor of Nevada in 2018
Brian Sandoval, president of the University of Nevada, Reno (2020–present) and former Governor of Nevada (2011–2019)

General election

Predictions

References

External links 
Official campaign websites 
Jacky Rosen (D) for Senate

2024
Nevada
United States Senate